The Tarka River is a river in the Eastern Cape, South Africa. Along with the Baviaans River, Grootbrak River and Kat River it is a major eastern tributary of the Great Fish River. The Lake Arthur Dam and the Kommandodrif Dam are located in this river. The latter is included in the Commando Drift Nature Reserve.

The Tarka river is part of the Fish to Tsitsikama Water Management Area.

References

External links
Fish to Sundays: Internal Strategic Perspective

Rivers of the Eastern Cape